Globena is a rural locality (a village) in Domshinskoye Rural Settlement, Sheksninsky District, Vologda Oblast, Russia. The population was 10 as of 2002.

Geography 
Globena is located 39 km southeast of Sheksna (the district's administrative centre) by road. Kozhevnikovo is the nearest rural locality.

References 

Rural localities in Sheksninsky District